Ortmark is a surname. Notable people with the surname include:

Åke Ortmark (1929–2018), Swedish journalist, author, and radio and television presenter
Jacob Ortmark (born 1997), Swedish footballer 

Swedish-language surnames